The Vallée Verte (literally: Green Valley) is a valley in the Chablais Alps, about 15 kilometres south of Thonon-les-Bains in the Haute-Savoie area of France. The river Menoge flows through it. It has as south-southwest orientation and a length of about 20 kilometres. Many of its inhabitants work near Geneva or Annemasse. Tourism is important to the local economy, though once important agriculture and forestry has declined since the end of the 20th century.

Landforms of Haute-Savoie
Valleys of France
Landforms of Auvergne-Rhône-Alpes